Clappia is a genus of small freshwater snails that have an operculum, aquatic gastropod mollusks in the family Lithoglyphidae.  

Generic name Clappia is in honor of malacologist George Hubbard Clapp.

Species
There are two species within the genus Clappia:
 Clappia cahabensis Clench, 1965 - Cahaba pebblesnail
 † Clappia umbilicata (Walker, 1904) - Umbilicate pebblesnail, type species as Clapppia clappi
Synonyms
 Clappia cabahensis Clench, 1965: synonym of Clappia cahabensis Clench, 1965
 Clappia clappi B. Walker, 1909: synonym of Clappia umbilicata (B. Walker, 1904) (a junior synonym)

Comparison of apertural views of both species:

References

Lithoglyphidae
Gastropod genera
Taxonomy articles created by Polbot